From 1 July to 5 August 1969, ten Crimean Tatar civil rights activists frequently dubbed the "Tashkent Ten" were tried in the Tashkent City Court under Articles 190-1 of the RSFSR Criminal Code and similar codes of other Soviet republics for activities the prosecutor Boris Berezovsky described as "being actively involved in solving the so-called Crimean Tatar issue [sic]". In line with standard practice at the time, the inditement and prosecution documents consistently labeled Crimean Tatars referred to in them not as Crimean Tatars but as "persons of Tatar nationality who previously lived in Crimea" and avoided acknowledging Crimean Tatars to be a distinct ethnic group, using degrading phrases like "so-called Crimean Tatars" to mock the defendants use of the ethnonym "Crimean Tatar", which the defendants in turn denounced during the proceedings.

Defendants 
 Svetlana Ametova
 Reshat Bayramov
 Ayder Bariev
 Ruslan Eminov
 Ridvan Gafarov
 Izzet Khairov
 Munira Khalilova
 Rollan Qadiyev
 Riza Umerov
 Ismail Yazydzhiev

References

Bibliography
 Ташкентский процесс: Суд над десятью представителями крымскотатарского народа (1 июля – 5 августа 1969 г.): Сборник документов с иллюстрациями. – Амстердам: Фонд имени Герцена, 1976. – 854 с., [4] л. ил.: портр., факс. – (Серия «Библиотека Самиздата»; № 7)

Soviet show trials
Politics of the Crimean Tatars
1969 in the Soviet Union